Ditherington is a suburb of the town of Shrewsbury, the county town of Shropshire, England. It is the fourth most deprived ward in non-metropolitan Shropshire.

There has been much regeneration work in the southern part of Ditherington, which is close to Shrewsbury town centre. Various residential developments have occurred, but little has been finished.

Ditherington Flax Mill

The Flax Mill (also locally known as the "Maltings") is the oldest iron-framed building in the world and is seen as the "grandfather of skyscrapers". It was designed by Charles Bage and built in 1797 for John Marshall of Leeds and his partners.  

It is a Grade I listed building. After decades of being derelict, it was restored and rejuvenated by Historic England, in partnership with the Friends of the Flaxmill Maltings and other organisations. The restored building opened to the public in September 2022 with a new visitor experience centre, café, offices and hirable venue space. In the long term, it is hoped that the building will be able to make sufficient money to be self-supporting, but reaching this stage will require much investment.

Canal
The Shrewsbury and Newport Canal terminated in Ditherington, but no longer exists. This may also one day be restored.

See also
 Harlescott
 Sundorne

Suburbs of Shrewsbury
Industrial Revolution